This is the discography of the singer Philip Bailey, who has released 11 studio albums, one compilation album, and 10 singles.

Albums

Studio albums

Compilations

Singles

Other charted songs

References

Discographies of American artists
Rhythm and blues discographies
Soul music discographies